Maniava or Manyava is located on the banks of the Maniavka River in Ivano-Frankivsk Raion, Ivano-Frankivsk Oblast of Western Ukraine. It is a village of about 3,500 people and is situated in the Ukrainian Carpathian mountains. Maniava belongs to Solotvyn settlement hromada, one of the hromadas of Ukraine. 

Until 18 July 2020, Maniava belonged to Bohorodchany Raion. The raion was abolished in July 2020 as part of the administrative reform of Ukraine, which reduced the number of raions of Ivano-Frankivsk Oblast to six. The area of Bohorodchany Raion was merged into Ivano-Frankivsk Raion.

The famous Orthodox Maniava Skete monastery is located on its outskirts, and the one of the highest waterfall in Ukraine's Carpathian mountains – the height of the waterfall is 20 meters.

 Postal code is 77772 
 Telephone code is +380 3471

References

Notes

Sources
 
 Maniava, Western Ukraine

Villages in Ivano-Frankivsk Raion